This is a list of the candidates that ran for the Marijuana Party in the 41st Canadian federal election. The party fielded only five candidates, each of whom was located in Ontario.

In the 2011 election, the Marijuana Party of Canada received a total of 1,863 votes and roughly 0.01% of the popular vote. None of the candidates were elected.

Ontario

References

2011